The Bauchi Prison break was an attack on the federal prison in the Northern Nigerian city of Bauchi, in which members of Boko Haram released 721 prisoners. The attack occurred on September 7, 2010, and was carried out by approximately 50 gunmen. Of the 721 prisoners who escaped, as many as 150 were affiliated with Boko Haram. The Bauchi prison break was part of a broader escalation of Boko Haram activity, that escalation served as retaliation for the death of one of the group's primary leaders. Following this, Boko Haram has staged multiple subsequent attacks on government and religious targets in Bauchi state.

Background
Nigeria is largely split between the Christian south and Muslim north, and tensions have built between the two groups. There has been Religious violence in Nigeria since 1953. The prisoners in Bauchi were largely awaiting trial for sectarian violence committed in the country in 2009. The group which conducted the prison raid, Boko Haram, was involved in this sectarian violence.   

Members of Boko Haram previously staged an attack on a police station in Bauchi state on 26 July, 2009, in which 150 people were killed. This was followed by a spurt of coordinated attacks across multiple states, including in neighbouring Borno state. During an aggressive government response, Boko Haram's leader Mohammed Yusuf was arrested on 30 July, 2009. He was killed in an extrajudicial killing by the police after interrogation, although some sources claim that he was killed while being taken into custody. Officials both believed and announced that Yusuf's death would lead to the group's collapse. It instead resulted in increased recruitment and expansion, and escalation of the group's activities. The killing of Yusuf while in custody has been characterized as one of the group's primary grievances against the Nigerian government. Yusuf's second-in-command, Abubakar Shekau, subsequently threatened retaliation against the government for the deaths of Boko Haram members.

Incident

Boko Haram planned the attack on Bauchi prison in the evening, anticipating that Muslim prison guards would be attending evening prayer during Ramadan. Out of a total of 759 prisoners, 721 were freed by members of Boko Haram. While accounts vary, it is estimated that between 105 and 150 of the escaped prisoners were affiliated with Boko Haram. Over thirty of the prisoners returned to the prison to serve out their short sentences. Additionally thirty-five prisoners were re-arrested. Parts of the jail were set on fire, killing five people and hospitalizing six. At least one police officer was among those killed, along with bystanders. Boko Haram also used the attack on the federal prison as an opportunity to distribute recruitment and propaganda materials. The attackers left leaflets around the prison, detailing the group's background and manifesto, and exhorting readers to also take up arms for their cause. The language in these leaflets served as the group's formal "declaration of war" against the government.

Aftermath
The state governor, Isa Yuguda, announced on 8 September 2010 that members of Boko Haram should leave the state or will be flushed out forcefully. The government's response to Boko Haram activity has relied heavily on military and police resources. The city temporarily added military checkpoints on major roads. According to the state police commissioner, Danlami Yar'Adua, eleven suspected members of Boko Haram were arrested during this campaign. The Nigerian government also pledged to tighten security at other prisons, especially those thought to be vulnerable to attack. The minister for the interior, Emmanuel Iheanacho, stated that the “[Nigerian people's] safety and security remains paramount to us."

Since the attack on the prison in 2010, Boko Haram has also launched attacks on a police station and army barracks in Bauchi. In 2012, the group carried out a suicide bombing at a church in Bauchi. The prison break in Bauchi is not the only such attack coordinated by Boko Haram. The 2014 Kogi Prison break, which released 119 inmates, was attributed to the group as well. Boko Haram later escalated its presence in the Lake Chad Basin, which countries in the region including Nigeria and Chad have addressed with the Multinational Joint Force.

See also

Ekiti prison break
Kogi prison break
Boko Haram insurgency
Edo prison break

References

Boko Haram activities
2010 crimes in Nigeria
Bauchi State
Prison escapes
Prison raids
September 2010 events in Nigeria
Escapees from Nigerian detention